A number of geographic features in Greenland were named after Greenlandic Inuit. 
Arctic explorer Knud Rasmussen was partly of Greenlandic origin and several places and landforms in Greenland, such as the Knud Rasmussen Range and  Knud Rasmussen Land, were named after him. The following places were named after not so well-known Inuit persons:

 Brønlund's Grave
 Cape Christiansen
 Hannah Island
 Hans Island
 Hendrik Island
 Joe Island
 Jørgen Brønlund Fjord
 Navarana Fjord
 Tobias Glacier
 Tobias Island (Tuppiap Qeqertaa)
 Tobias Valley

References

External links
Hannah and Joe on the Map - Nunatsiaq News
Place names in Northeastern Greenland- GEUS

 Features
Greenland
Inuit placenames
Inuit placenames
Greenland